The 26th BRDC International Trophy was a non-championship Formula One race held at Silverstone on 7 April 1974. The 40-lap race was run in connection with a Formula 5000 event, and was won from pole position by James Hunt, driving a Hesketh-Ford, with Jochen Mass second in a Surtees-Ford and Jean-Pierre Jarier third in a Shadow-Ford.

Classification 
Note: a blue background indicates a Formula 5000 entrant.

References

BRDC International Trophy
BRDC International Trophy
Formula 5000 race reports
BRDC